Brookside Golf Resort is a public golf course located in Hatchet Cove, Newfoundland, Canada.

The Course
Brookside Golf Resort is a 9-hole picturesque course that traverses hilly terrain and overlooks Random Sound in Trinity Bay.

See also
List of golf courses in Newfoundland and Labrador

References

External links
Official website

Golf clubs and courses in Newfoundland and Labrador